

Cooper Square is a junction of streets in Lower Manhattan in New York City located at the confluence of the neighborhoods of Bowery to the south, NoHo to the west and southwest, Greenwich Village to the west and northwest, the East Village to the north and east, and the Lower East Side to the southeast.

Description
Beginning at its southern end where the Bowery crosses East 4th Street, the road then splits in two, both with Cooper Square addresses, until they cross Astor Place between East 8th Street and St. Marks Place and become Fourth Avenue (the western street) and Third Avenue (the eastern street).

Because Bowery, Third Avenue and both sides of Cooper Square are two-way streets, the intersection is complex, and difficult for pedestrians to navigate, especially considering that it is part of a city-approved through-truck route. The New York City Department of Transportation has announced plans to "normalize" traffic, increase the size of the park in the middle of the square, and create a new community park in the area.

History
When the square was initially opened as a public space in 1850, it was named "Stuyvesant Square", despite there already being a "Stuyvesant Square" about a half-mile north on Second Avenue. It was renamed for Peter Cooper, the 19th Century industrialist and philanthropist, after his death in 1883. In 1853, Cooper had broken ground for Cooper Union for the Advancement of Science and Art, an institution founded on the belief that high-quality education should be available to all who qualified, including women – a radical notion at the time – without cost. It continued to provide every student with a full-tuition scholarship until 2014. Frederick A. Peterson's Cooper Union Foundation Building on the north end of the square, the oldest existing American building framed with steel beams, still stands where it was located when it opened in 1859, but the interior was extensively reconstructed in 1975 not only to modernize it, but also to fulfill one of Cooper's plans which was never realized at the time: the installation of a round elevator. The exterior of the building was restored in 1999 as well.

Downtown of the Foundation Building is a small park, Cooper Triangle, which includes a monument dedicated to Peter Cooper.  Across the street, at 41 Cooper Square, is the school's newest building, the New Academic Building, designed by Thom Mayne of Morphosis.

The Village Voices headquarters are on the western side of the square, as are classroom buildings of Grace Church School and Kaplan, Inc. The sleek, modern high-rise Cooper Square Hotel at 25 is one of the newest buildings on the square.

The New York City Department of Transportation's "Reconstruction of Astor Place and Cooper Square" plan calls for some changes to be made to Cooper Square beginning in 2013. The western leg of the square will be a northbound bus-only lane, from a two-way multi-use roadway. The confusing intersection of the two legs at Fifth Street would become a simple "Village Plaza", with sidewalk extensions and a small amphitheater on the western sidewalk. Finally, Cooper Triangle would be renovated, and expanded to make a new "Cooper Walk" leading up to Cooper Union. New trees would be planted up and down the square on both sides.

Gallery

See also
Astor Place

References
Notes

External links

The Cooper Square Committee
Cooper Union's website

Squares in Manhattan
East Village, Manhattan
Streets in Manhattan